Seema Deo (born as Nalini Saraf; 1942) is Hindi and Marathi movie veteran actress. She has acted in over 80 Marathi and Hindi movies.

Early life 
She was born and brought up in Girgaum, Mumbai.

Personal life 
She was married to actor Ramesh Deo. They have two sons, actor Ajinkya Deo and director Abhinay Deo. She has been suffering from Alzheimer's disease.

Filmography

See also 

 Ramesh Deo
 Ajinkya Deo
 Abhinay Deo

References

External links
 

Actresses from Mumbai
Indian film actresses
Actresses in Hindi cinema
Actresses in Marathi cinema
Living people
20th-century Indian actresses
21st-century Indian actresses
1942 births